Igreja de São Pedro may refer to:

 Igreja de São Pedro (Abragão), a church in Portugal
 Igreja de São Pedro (Leiria), a church in Portugal